Henrik Johan Walbeck (11 October 1793 – 23 October 1822) was a Finnish geodesist and astronomer who studied the size and figure of the Earth by means of arc measurements.

Walbeck was born in Turku (Åbo). In 1817, he was made a corresponding member of the Royal Swedish Academy of Sciences and, in 1820, of the Royal Astronomical Society and the Mathematische Gesellschaft in Hamburg. He committed suicide in 1822, also in Åbo.

The asteroid 1695 Walbeck is named after him.

References

External links
 Finnish Geodetic Institute.
 Walbeck, Henrik Johan in the Web version of Uppslagsverket Finland (in Swedish). 

1793 births
1822 deaths
Finnish geodesists
Members of the Royal Swedish Academy of Sciences